Bhojpur Assembly constituency may refer to
 Bhojpur, Madhya Pradesh Assembly constituency
 Bhojpur, Uttar Pradesh Assembly constituency